The Diriá National Park, until 2004 the Diriá National Forest Wildlife Refuge, is a National Park of Costa Rica south of Santa Cruz in the Guanacaste Province, and forms part of the Tempisque Conservation Area. It protects both dry and at higher elevations humid tropical forest in the central highlands of the Nicoya Peninsula, including the watersheds of the Diriá, Tigre, Verde and Enmedio rivers which have been created a terrain of deep valleys with steep slopes.

The  park has a ranger station which is open daily from 8am to 4pm for visitors and tourists, and contains species such as deer, howler monkeys, anteaters and peccary, besides 134 known species of birds. There are several rare tree species, as well as endemic plant species, including the Pitcairnia bromeliad and a type of Stenocereus cactus, which are only found on the Nicoya Peninsula. It was originally designated as a protected zone in 1991 and then two years later it became a National wildlife refuge.

The park has two trails that leave the ranger station, one of which leads to the Brasil Waterfall. There is a basic dormitory at the ranger station where travelers can stay overnight.

References

External links
Diria National Park at Costa Rica National Parks

National parks of Costa Rica
Protected areas established in 1991
Geography of Guanacaste Province
Tourist attractions in Guanacaste Province
1991 establishments in Costa Rica